Trzebiechów  is a village in the administrative district of Gmina Maszewo, within Krosno Odrzańskie County, Lubusz Voivodeship, in western Poland.

References

Villages in Krosno Odrzańskie County